Andrea Mann is a Canadian actress, film and television producer, film director and screenwriter. She works at Amaze Film and Television and lives in London, UK.

Actress
Palais Royale (1988)
The Fly II (1989)
Cousins (1989)
Look Who's Talking (1989)
Omen IV: The Awakening (1991)
Death Wish V: The Face of Death (1994)

Producer
Madness of Method (1996) (executive producer)
Xxxposed (2000) (producer)
Sweet Sixteen (2002) (associate producer)
Foolproof (2003) (associate producer)
Saint Ralph (2004)

Director 
Xxxposed (2000)

Writer 
Xxxposed (2000)

External links

Canadian film actresses
Canadian television actresses
Canadian women film directors
Canadian film producers
Canadian television producers
Canadian women television producers
Canadian women screenwriters
Living people
Year of birth missing (living people)
Canadian women film producers
21st-century Canadian women writers
21st-century Canadian screenwriters